R v. Instan (1893) 1 QB 450 is an English criminal law manslaughter case, confirming how the actus reus of manslaughter can be one of inactive negligence (that is, neglect), as the common law imposes a basic duty of care onto an adult who voluntarily undertakes the regular care of another.  Here the defendant was related to a patient who had gangrene and had in her home the funds for food to maintain both parties.  Its jurisprudential explanations for how the common law is arrived at by such a research and analysis process, not in a vacuum, but rather by reference to strong moral obligations has been widely cited by other leading decisions. It is one of the many appeal-level decisions which inform the variety of acts and omissions sufficient to amount to the offence of gross negligence manslaughter, which subtly changes very slightly as society's codes of morality and professional contexts evolve.

Facts
The defendant lived with her aunt aged 73 years. The aunt was healthy until shortly before her death. During the last 12 days of her life, she had been incapacitated by a gangrenous foot to the point of immobility. Only the defendant knew of this condition. She appeared not to have made any attempts in obtaining treatment or care for the aunt, neither did she provide her with food with which the aunt thus went without, but continued residence and dependency on her aunt's estate. The defendant was charged and convicted of manslaughter.

Judgment

The adult niece was found guilty of manslaughter, on the basis that she had accepted her aunt's money in to pay for their food.  She was thus not entitled to "apply it all for her own use" (spend it all on her own food). This generated a duty of care from the niece towards the aunt. The intentional neglect of the aunt was consequently a crime. Lord Coleridge CJ wrote that despite the lack of statute or precedent, it would be "a slur on justice" were the niece's behaviour to go unpunished:

We are all of opinion that this conviction must be affirmed. It would not be correct to say that every moral obligation involves a legal duty; but every legal duty is founded on a moral obligation. A legal common law duty is nothing else than the enforcing by law of that which is a moral obligation without legal enforcement. There can be no question in this case that it was the clear duty of the prisoner to impart to the deceased so much as was necessary to sustain life of the food which she from time to time took in, and which was paid for by the deceased's own money for the purpose of the maintenance of herself and the prisoner; it was only through the instrumentality of the prisoner that the deceased could get the food. There was, therefore, a common law duty imposed upon the prisoner which she did not discharge.

Nor can there be any question that the failure of the prisoner to discharge her legal duty at least accelerated the death of the deceased, if it did not actually cause it. There is no case directly in point; but it would be a slur upon and a discredit to the administration of justice in this country if there were any doubt as to the legal principle, or as to the present case being within it. The prisoner was under a moral obligation to the deceased from which arose a legal duty towards her; that legal duty the prisoner has wilfully and deliberately left unperformed, with the consequence that there has been an acceleration of the death of the deceased owing to the non-performance of that legal duty. it is unnecessary to say more than that upon the evidence this conviction was most properly arrived at.

Financial and sentencing outcome
The niece would be disinherited by law, by virtue of the forfeiture rule.

The starting point (considered in sentencing) for such an offence of this exact nature remains a custodial sentence.

See also
English law
Making of a new precedent
Judicial activism
Common law offence
Homicide in English law
Gross negligence manslaughter
Criminal negligence - the level that is often called "gross" in the same offence.

Notes

External links
Bailii.org, a free online case (law) reports of: England & Wales; Republic of Ireland; Scotland; Northern Ireland; Jersey; St Helena.

I
1893 in England
1893 in case law
1893 in British law
Manslaughter in the United Kingdom